The Big Fisherman is a 1959 American historical drama film directed by Frank Borzage about the life of Simon Peter, one of the  disciples of Jesus. Starring Howard Keel, Susan Kohner and John Saxon, the production is adapted from the 1948 novel by Lloyd C. Douglas, which is closely related to Douglas' previous book, 1942's The Robe which, six years earlier, in 1953, had been adapted for the screen under the same title, The Robe. The film was shot at Universal-International studios but released by Buena Vista, the film releasing company of Walt Disney Productions.

The Robe ends with "the Big Fisherman" as a nickname for Peter; Jesus called him "the fisher of men" and "the Rock".

Plot
The story traces Peter's journey from self-sufficient fisherman to his dependency on a risen Christ. It also presents another story of redemption and forgiveness, as he takes in a young Arab/Jewish girl, Fara. As they both learn of Jesus, it changes their lives.

The young Fara discovers that she is the daughter of Herod Antipas who married and shortly discarded her Arab mother in favor of Herodias. Disguised as a boy, Fara goes to Galilee to assassinate Herod in revenge.

Robbed by bandits, Fara is discovered by John the Baptist who advises her to listen to the great teacher, Jesus. She comes under the protection of Peter but vows to kill Herod.  She manages to be employed in Herod's household to translate a series of prophecies.

Fara and Peter hear Jesus teaching. Fara turns away when he urges nonviolence. Peter is initially cynical, but in stages is drawn to become his disciple.

Fara gains an opportunity to kill Herod, and reveals her identity to him. As Peter watches, Herod urges her not to sink to murder. Fara recalls the words of Christ, and lowers her knife. Peter declares her free of her own chains.

Peter takes Fara to Arabia where they rescue Voldi, an Arab prince who wishes to marry her. However, Fara realises that her mixed race would jeopardize his future rule, so she leaves with Peter to spread the word of peace.

Cast
 Howard Keel as Simon-Peter
 Susan Kohner as Fara
 John Saxon as Voldi
 Martha Hyer as Herodias
 Herbert Lom as Herod-Antipas
 Ray Stricklyn as Deran
 Marian Seldes as Arnon
 Alexander Scourby as David Ben-Zadok
 Beulah Bondi as Hannah
 Jay Barney as John the Baptist
 Charlotte Fletcher as Rennah
 Mark Dana as Zendi
 Rhodes Reason as Andrew
 Henry Brandon as Mencius
 Brian Hutton as John
 Thomas Troupe as James
 Marianne Stewart as Ione
 Jonathan Harris as Lysias
 Leonard Mudie as Ilderan
 James Griffith as The beggar
 Peter Adams as Phillip
 Jo Gilbert as Deborah
 Michael Mark as Innkeeper
 Joe Di Reda as Assassin
 Stuart Randall as Aretas
 Herbert Rudley as Tiberius
 Phillip Pine as Lucius
 Francis McDonald as Scribe spokesman
 Perry Ivins as Pharisee spokesman
 Ralph Moody as Aged Pharisee
 Jony Jochim as Sadducee spokesman
 Don Turner as Roman captain

Production
The film was Rowland V. Lee's first in over 10 years. It was shot in Super Panavision 70 (the first film so credited) by Lee Garmes. The original music score was composed by Albert Hay Malotte, an American composer who is best known for his musical setting of The Lord's Prayer, composed in 1935, and introduced on radio that year by John Charles Thomas.

Though originally rejected by Walt Disney because of its religious tone, the film was supported by Roy Disney, and was distributed by Buena Vista, making it one of the few religious films ever associated with the Disney Company.

It was shot on location in the San Fernando Valley in California. Portions were shot at La Quinta, California.

After having starred in a number of MGM film musicals from 1950 (Annie Get Your Gun) to 1955 (Kismet), Howard Keel switched to straight acting roles with the 1958 British noir thriller Floods of Fear, followed by The Big Fisherman. He starred or co-starred in six additional features (four of which were westerns) between 1961 and 1968 and made his final appearance in a 2002 film, playing a supporting role.

John Saxon was borrowed from Universal.

It was Borzage's last film that he completed.

Reception
Variety called it "pious but plodding."

Leonard Maltin's Movie Guide (2012 edition) gave The Big Fisherman 2½ stars out of 4, describing it as a "sprawling religious epic" and deciding that it is "seldom dull, but not terribly inspiring." Steven H. Scheuer's Movies on TV and Videocassette (1993–1994 edition) also settled on 2½ stars out of 4, writing that "the story of Simon called Peter" "unfolds with predictable pageantry and uplifting sermonizing".

Assigning 2 stars (out of 5), The Motion Picture Guide (1987 edition) found it to be "long, often-enraging and totally miscast" with "a nonsinging Keel as Saint Peter". Evaluating the presentation as "just so much biblical nonsense because such liberties are taken that any serious student of the life and surrounding events will take exception," the write-up declares that "Douglas wrote the novel but made the mistake of entrusting it to the wrong people." After pointing out the film's "numerous technical mistakes: microphone boom shadows, klieg lights, Martha Hyer's vaccination mark", the Guide concludes that "to make a love story the focal point of such a potentially dynamic saga of history's most memorable era was a bad decision. One of the rare bummers by Disney in those years."

Leslie Halliwell in his Film and Video Guide (5th edition, 1985) dismissed it as a "well-meaning but leaden adaptation of a bestselling novel which followed on from The Robe. He concluded that it is "too reverent by half, and in many respects surprisingly incompetent." Halliwell's quoted Monthly Film Bulletin ("its overall flatness of conception and execution is a stiff price to pay for the lack of spectacular sensationalism characterizing its fellow-epics") and The Hollywood Reporter ("the picture is three hours long, and, except for those who can be dazzled by big gatherings of props, horses and camels, it is hard to find three minutes of entertainment in it").

Running time
Leonard Maltin's Movie Guide (2012 edition) notes that the film's running time was originally 184 minutes, then cut to 164 minutes then to 149 minutes.

Awards and honors
The film was nominated for three Academy Awards:
 Lee Garmes for Best Cinematography
 Renié for Best Costume Design
 John DeCuir and Julia Heron for Best Art Direction (color)

References

External links

 
 
 
 The Big Fisherman at TV Guide (a longer form of this 1987 write-up was originally published in The Motion Picture Guide)
 
 
 The Big Fisherman (e-book) available freely at the Project Gutenberg of Australia website.

1959 films
American historical drama films
1950s historical drama films
Films based on the Gospels
1959 drama films
Films directed by Frank Borzage
Cultural depictions of Saint Peter
Films based on American novels
Films with screenplays by Howard Estabrook
Religious epic films
1950s English-language films
1950s American films